Switzerland and the United Kingdom have enjoyed close bilateral historical relations for a long time, which continue today.

History
Ever since the 18th century British politicians have made much of Switzerland's neutrality on the European continent and repeatedly took Switzerland's side when dealing with other European powers.  Since 1900 the United Kingdom has maintained 12 consulates in Switzerland.  Switzerland represented British interests in Germany, Italy, Spain, Japan, and the Axis occupied and allied countries during World War II from 1941 to 1945.

During the Cold War Anglo-Swiss relations became even closer, and due to common interests there was cooperation on a number of issues. Both countries worked together to forestall European integration in the 1960s.

Contacts and relations between the two countries remain close to this day with the respective countries' foreign ministers regularly meeting up to discuss issues of shared concern.

Economy
Switzerland has been a favourite destination for British tourists since the 19th century.  The UK is the fourth-most important market in the world for Swiss investors.  Around 700 Swiss companies currently do business in the UK with the financial sector playing a large role in Anglo-Swiss economic relations. The British Swiss Chamber of Commerce is an independent organization providing network services for its over 500 members.

Security cooperation
During the Cold War, the Swiss Army unit Projekt-26 received covert training from the British intelligence agencies MI5 and MI6. In the event of an invasion of Switzerland, P-26 planned to relocate its command centre to Britain.

Resident diplomatic missions 
 Switzerland has an embassy in London.
 The United Kingdom has an embassy in Bern.

References

Further reading
 Horn, David Bayne. Great Britain and Europe in the eighteenth century (1967), covers 1603 to 1702; pp 310–26.
 Wylie, Neville. Britain, Switzerland, and the Second World War (Oxford UP, 2003).
 Wyss, Marco. Arms transfers, neutrality and Britain's role in the Cold War: Anglo-Swiss relations 1945-1958 (Brill, 2012).

 
United Kingdom
Bilateral relations of the United Kingdom